Silent Tears (Chinese:女人不哭) (2006) is a TV series starring Tian Hairong (田海蓉).

Plot
Zhang Zijun's parents died leave her a brother and a sister. She is strong and becomes the big sister of a gang of boys. Growing up, she overcomes many difficulties meet and becomes a successful businesswoman.

Reception
The TV series is well received by viewers, other TV series of woman life stories produced are also well received.

Xue Zai Shao (雪在烧) (2007)

Beautiful life (笑着活下去) (2007)

Wo Shi Yi Ke Xiao Cao (我是一棵小草) (2008)

Nu Ren Yi Bei Zi　(女人一辈子) (2007) (上部) by a different producer.

2006 Chinese television series debuts

Mandarin-language television shows
Chinese drama television series